Djoke van Marum  (born 22 September 1959) is a Dutch female Paralympic sitting volleyball player. She is part of the Netherlands women's national sitting volleyball team.

She competed at the  2008 Summer Paralympics finishing third,

References

External links
 Djoke van Marum
 Djoke van Marum gehuldigd na bronzen plak EK paravolleybal | Nieuwsblad voor Huizen

1959 births
Living people
Dutch amputees
Dutch sitting volleyball players
Dutch sportswomen
Medalists at the 2008 Summer Paralympics
Paralympic volleyball players of the Netherlands
Volleyball players at the 2004 Summer Paralympics
Volleyball players at the 2008 Summer Paralympics
Volleyball players at the 2012 Summer Paralympics
Women's sitting volleyball players
People from Diemen
Paralympic medalists in volleyball
Paralympic bronze medalists for the Netherlands
Sportspeople from North Holland
20th-century Dutch women
21st-century Dutch women